ZenBook is a family of ultrabooks – low-bulk laptop computers – produced by Asus. The first ZenBooks were released in October 2011, and the original range of products was amended and expanded during 2012. Models range from 12-inch laptops featuring power efficient components but lacking connectivity and having only integrated graphics processors, to 15-inch laptops with discrete graphics processing units and optical disc drives. Most (though not all) ZenBooks use Intel Core ultra-low-voltage processors and Nvidia GPUs when integrated graphics are not used. Asus introduced new models with touch screens to take advantage of Windows 8 after its release in late 2012. Most models drew comparisons to the MacBook Air. The ZenBook mainly competes against computers such as Acer's Aspire, Dell's Inspiron and XPS, HP's Pavilion, HP Stream and Envy, Lenovo's IdeaPad, Samsung's Sens and Toshiba's Satellite.

Asus designed the ZenBooks with brushed aluminium chassis and high rigidity, rather than plastic, the usual laptop construction material. A pattern of concentric circles on the lids is said to represent ripples in water and represent the "zen philosophy" that designers wanted to portray when creating the laptops. ZenBooks have been generally well received due to their chassis design and appearance as well as the high quality screens used in later models. However, the touchpad software was found to be erratic, particularly on the early models  and some of the models received criticism for their high prices. Some models (such as the UX32) suffer from lockdown when the lithium polymer battery cell gets drained or discharged below its recommended threshold, for example if the device is left on and unattended. The result is that the charger will fail to recharge the battery even when plugged in, leaving the machine in a near-complete unresponsive off-state. The machine can often be revived by pressing the power-on key for 10 seconds, whereupon it will start recharging.

Design 

In 2009 Asus released the UX50V, a 15-inch laptop that was focused on energy efficiency and had a thin profile. The laptop was rated poorly by reviewers as it under-performed and had mediocre battery life, despite the installed energy efficient hardware. Although not branded as one, it bore the same "UX" product code as many of the later ZenBooks and was an early foray into the ultraportable market.

The ZenBook name was proposed by Asus chairman Jonney Shih to reflect the "zen philosophy" applied to the design. The chief designer, Loewy Chen, had wanted to incorporate design elements from luxury watches into his products for a long time. ZenBooks were the first opportunity to put this into practice, the crossover being achieved, he said, by "the unfolding of the laptop from the side recalling the elegance of minute and hour hand movements". The reference to watches is also reflected in the marketing of ZenBooks; Asus published design sketches overlaying an open ZenBook on a watch face, and video advertisements feature similar imagery. The concentric circles on the lid of Zenbooks were intended to look like ripples in water and to reflect "philosophical ideas such as the infinite nature of Zen thinking and self-improvement".

The bodies of the ZenBooks are made of aluminium, chosen for its light weight, strength, vibration dampening, appearance and acoustic properties. Both the bodies and lids are CNC milled and brushed for appearance. Reviewers have noted the resulting superior rigidity and complimented the appearance of the ZenBook range.

To preserve space, some Zenbooks use two PCBs connected by a communications ribbon so it can have ports on both sides of the device, with a heatsink and fan centred between them.

In 2017, Asus debuted ScreenPad with the ZenBook Pro 15 UX580. The ScreenPad replaces the regular touchpad with a colour capactive touchscreen display. This technology was then in 2019 included in the ZenBook 13 (UX334), ZenBook 14 (UX434) and ZenBook 15 (UX534) and offered optionally on the lower end lineup of VivoBook S laptops.

In 2019, as a successor the 2018's ZenBook Pro, the ZenBook Duo and ZenBook Pro Duo feature two screens – one at the regular position and the other above keyboard. This second display resulted into the move of the keyboard nearer to the chin and the touchpad to where a numberpad would be similarly to Asus' gaming ROG Zephyrus laptop.

Controversy 
Numerous Zenbook models with resolution specifications of QHD+ (3200 × 1800) and 4K (3840 × 2160) utilize Pentile RG/BW displays, which are regarded by some as a "shady practice" and "sort of cheating".

Specifications

Reception 

The first official ZenBooks, the ZenBook UX21E and UX31E drew comparisons to the MacBook Air and it was regarded as an "excellent rival" by CNET reviewer Andrew Hoyle. Other aspects of the laptops that reviewers liked were the Bang and Olufsen speakers, fast boot times due to Asus' BIOS design and the speed of general tasks within the operating system resulting from the SSD and Sandy Bridge processors. However, the screens drew criticism for their poor contrast ratio, colour accuracy and less than perfect viewing angle, although they were praised for their brightness and the sharpness of the UX31's screen. Reviewers also noted the shallow key-press of the metal keyboard and lack of backlighting, a feature that Asus did not have time to implement before shipping.

The new screens on the ZenBook Prime were highly praised by reviewers when considering brightness, contrast ratio, viewing angle and colour accuracy, the improvements over previous models being put down to the switch from TN to IPS displays. The keyboard also garnered praise for the increased backlighting and improved key travel while the Intel Wi-Fi controller was found to perform better than the Qualcomm used in the first generation of Zenbooks. The Zenbook Primes still received some criticism: the latest version of the touchpad was acknowledged as an improvement over the original Zenbooks, but still irritating, and the sound quality was found to be worse than that with the first generation. Despite these issues, the overall reaction was positive: the UX31A was called "today's best ultrabook" and "the best ultrabook out there" at the time of release.

The ZenBook UX32VD was well received for similar reasons to the Zenbook Prime. The screen, chassis and keyboard again garnered praise although the inclusion of a discrete GPU was noted as a major selling point. The hybrid drive attracted criticism for its slow performance and the same touchpad issues that the Zenbook Prime had were still present. SLR Lounge criticised the slow hybrid drive and 4 GB of RAM, but suggested replacing them as the option is available, noting that it was an option not often offered on ultrabooks.

As a cheaper option the ZenBook UX32A was praised by Chris Martin of PC Advisor for being "a more affordable luxury", retaining the "premium feel" of the Zenbook range but at a lower price point. The aluminium chassis, which is identical to the UX32VD to keep costs down, was widely acclaimed for its strength and build quality. By contrast, the Sandy Bridge chip, a previous-generation part at the time of sale, was outlined as a detraction as was the lower battery life compared to the UX31E. Although the screen used was a TN panel and of a lower resolution than the UX32VD or UX31A, it was considered an acceptable compromise for the price. The screen has a matte finish and relatively high brightness which Notebook Check's reviewer, Christian Hepp, found "quite suitable for outdoor use", noting that it had a good contrast ratio but a narrow range of colours.

The ZenBook UX42VS and UX52VS drew criticism for its high price and lack of touch screen, but the screen quality, keyboard and system speed were praised. The battery life was considered acceptable taking into account the form-factor and the discrete GPU, despite it being significantly shorter than the UX31A.

AnandTech reviewer Jason Inofuentes found the touch screen to be so superior to the touchpad that he stopped using the touchpad altogether in his trial of a Zenbook Touch at the Asus launch event. Chris Griffith of The Australian found that the screen of the UX31A responded well and that the Windows 8 gestures worked predictably, his only criticism being the high price.

The ZenBook UX430 is commonly reported to suffer from significant coil whine issues.

References

External links 

Asus products
Subnotebooks
Consumer electronics brands
Products introduced in 2011
Ultrabooks